Arangu is a 1991 Indian Malayalam film,  directed by Chandrasekharan. The film stars Thilakan, Ashokan, Sukumaran and Babu Namboothiri in the lead roles. The film has musical score by Johnson.

Cast

Thilakan as Adv. K. P. Menon
Manu Varma as Rajeevan
Sai Kumar as Xavier Robert Perara/Xavy
Jagathi Sreekumar as Sivaraman Pilla
Sukumaran as Public Prosecutor Adv. Robert Perera Vallokkaran
Ashokan as Unni Viswanath
Babu Namboothiri as Narayanankutty Nair
Geetha as A.S.P (Aparna. S. Menon) IPS
Kaviyoor Ponnamma as Madhavi
Shari as Alice
 Mahesh as Vineeth Menon
 T.P. Madhavan as Judge
 Prem Kumar as Pappan Govindan
 Adoor Bhavani as 	Aparna's Grandmother
 Swathi
 Baby Surendran
 K.P.A.C Sabu as Dr. Francis Mathew

Soundtrack
The music was composed by Johnson.

References

External links
 
 

1991 films
1990s Malayalam-language films
Films scored by Johnson